{{DISPLAYTITLE:C8H12O2}}
The molecular formula C8H12O2 (molar mass: 140.18 g/mol) may refer to:

 Dimedone
 2,2,4,4-Tetramethylcyclobutanedione
 Tuataric acid
 Vinylcyclohexene dioxide (VCD)

Molecular formulas